Giacomo Benedetti (born 8 March 1999) is an Italian professional footballer who plays as a midfielder for  club Pontedera.

Career
Born in Montepulciano, Benedetti started his career in Pianese youth sector, and was promoted to the first team on 2017–18 Serie D season. With the team, won the promotion to Serie C in 2018–19 Serie D, and he made his professional debut on 25 August 2019 against Pro Vercelli.

On 16 September 2020, he signed with Serie C club Pontedera. On 23 March 2021, he extended his contract with the club.

References

External links
 
 

1999 births
Living people
People from Montepulciano
Sportspeople from the Province of Siena
Italian footballers
Association football midfielders
Serie C players
Serie D players
U.S. Pianese players
U.S. Città di Pontedera players
Footballers from Tuscany